Dragica Džono (born 24 May 1987) is a Croatian handball player for ŽRK Zrinski Čakovec and a former player of the Croatian national team.

References

1987 births
Living people
Croatian female handball players
Sportspeople from Mostar

Mediterranean Games bronze medalists for Croatia
Competitors at the 2013 Mediterranean Games
Mediterranean Games medalists in handball
RK Podravka Koprivnica players
Competitors at the 2009 Mediterranean Games
21st-century Croatian women